Irene Byers (born 1906 or 1907), was an English novelist, poet and children's writer who wrote around forty books mostly published in the 1950s and 1960s.

Life
In her early career Byers worked as a freelance journalist specialising in interviews with famous people such as John Gielgud and Sybil Thorndike. Byers gave up her career on marriage, around 1930, to Cyril Byers, but took up writing again after her children were at school. She also wrote poems for her children during the war.

She was a regular contributor to the BBC's Woman's Hour and two of her books were serialised on Children's Hour. She also became an active member of the Croydon Writers' Circle. The circle provided support for her writing which was important as praise from her husband was rare.

Works
Many of Byers' works were written for children, including books on nature study. The Tablet reviewed Byers' 1953 "The Young Brevingtons" in Books of the Week as:

Her 1954 book Tim of Tamberly Forest was broadcast as "a serial play in four episodes" on BBC radio Children's Hour in 1955. The original novel was reviewed by The Spectator as: 

Her book Jewel of the Jungle was broadcast on Children's Hour in July 1956.

Bibliography
 The Circus, and other verses for children, illus. Donald Craig (1946)
 Our Outdoor Friends (1949-1952)
 Mystery at Barber's Reach, illus., A. E. Batchelor (1950)
 The Adventures of the Floating Flat, illus. Robert Johnston (1952)
 The First [etc.] Book of Our Outdoor Friends, illus. Constance Marshall (1952)
 The Young Brevingtons (1953)
 Tim of Tamberly Forest (1954)
 Out and about Tales, illus. Paxton Chadwick (1954)
 The Mystery of Midway Mill (1955)
 Catherine of Connors (1955)
 Adventure at Fairborough's Farm (1955)
 Adventure at Dillington Dene (1956)
 The Strange Story of Pippin Wood, illus. Mary Shillabeer (1956)
 The Sign of the Dolphin (1956)
 The Missing Masterpiece (1957)
 Jewel of the Jungle (1957)
 Adventure at the Blue Cockatoo (1958)
 Flowers for Melissa (1958)
 Kennel Maid Sally (1960)
 The Adventure road to reading, etc. (1961)
 Farm on the Fjord (1961)
 Tim returns to Tamberly (1962)
 Silka the Seal, illus. George Adamson (1962)
 Two on the Trail, illus. Joseph Acheson (1963)
 Foresters of Fourways, illus. Barry Gurbutt (1963)
 Joanna joins the Zoo, illus. Jillian Willett (1964)
 Trouble at Tamberly (1964)
 The Merediths of Mappins, illus. Victor Ambrus (1964); US edition: The Mystery at Mappins, illus. Victor Ambrus (New York: Charles Scribner's Sons, 1964)
 Magic in her Fingers, illus. Jillian Willett (1965)
 Half-day Thursday (1966)
 Foresters afield, illus. Michael Whittlesea (1966)
 Danny finds a family, illus. Sheila Bewley (1966)
 The House of the Speckled Browns, illus. Victor Ambrus (1967)  
 The stage under the cedars, illus. Michael Charlton (1969)
 Cameras on Carolyn, illus. Michael Charlton (1971)
 Timothy and Tiptoes, illus. Lynette Hemmant  (1974)
 Tiptoes wins through, illus. Lynette Hemmant  (1976)
 Tiptoes and the big race, illus. Lynette Hemmant (1979)
 Fox on the pavement, illus. Gabrielle Stoddart (1984)
 Rhymes and reveries (1989)
 Rhymes and remembrances (c1990)

Translations
Irene Byers' books have been translated into several languages, among them Dutch, German, Italian, Portuguese and Swedish.
 Het geheim van de boerderij, transl. by A. M. van Steyn-Dingjan of Adventure at Fairborough's Farm. Utrecht [etc.]: Het Spectrum, 1957
 Penny zoekt de dader, transl. by J. Meyknecht-Grossouw. Helmond: Helmond, c. 1958   
 De gevaarlijke bloem uit het oerwoud, transl. by Evelien van Amstel of Jewel of the Jungle. Utrecht [etc.]: Het Spectrum, 1958 
 Bloemen voor Melissa, transl. by J. Meyknecht-Grossouw of Flowers for Melissa. Helmond: Helmond, 1960
 De rit in de nacht, transl. by E. La Haye of The Strange Story of Pippin Wood, illus. by Mary Shillabeer. Utrecht [etc.]: Het Spectrum, 1961
 Avontuur op een woonboot, transl. by A. M. van Steyn-Dingjan of The Adventure of the Floating Flat.  Haarlem: De Spaarnestad; Antwerpen: Tijdschriften Uitgevers Mij, 1964 
 Silka, der Seehund, transl. by Christa Laufs of Silka the Seal, illus. by Franz Josef Tripp. Stuttgart: Herold Verlag, 1969
 Jenny und lauter Tiere: Ein Mädchen im Zoo, transl. by Gisela Sieber of Joanna Joins the Zoo. Stuttgart: Herold Verlag, 1967
 Il ciondolo rapito Turin: SAIE, 1959
 Três diabretes, transl. by Fernanda Pinto Rodrigues, illus. by Victor Ambrus. Lisbon: Editorial Minerva, 1967
 Kennelflickan, transl. by Gunvor Håkansson of Kennel Maid Sally. Stockholm: Lindqvist, 1962
 Familjen på Mappins, transl. by Gunvor Håkansson. Stockholm: Lindqvist, 1965
 Juvelkuppen, transl. by Gunvor Håkansson of Two on the Trail. Stockholm: B. Wahlström, 1973

Notes

External links

  Works by Irene Byers in the British Library

British women writers
British children's writers
Year of death missing
1900s births